The National Commission for Museums and Monuments (NCMM), also referred to as National Museum of Nigeria was Founded in 1979 by the Federal Government of Nigeria with decree 77 of 1979 to be in charge of the collection, documentation, conservation and presentation of the National Cultural properties to the public for the purposes of Education, Enlightenment and Entertainment. This decree recognized the National Commission for Museums and Monuments as a replacement for both the Federal Department of Antiquities of Nigeria and the Antiquities Commission. The decree has since been substituted in 1990 for the NCMM ACT, CAP 242 of the law of Federal Republic of Nigeria 1990.

Headquarter and Outlets 
The National Commission for Museums and Monuments (NCMM) has its headquarters in Abuja, and the commission manages 52 National Museum outlets, 10 libraries, 1 academic institution, 1 zoological garden and 65 Monuments which include historical and architectural landmarks as well as tangible and intangible cultural heritage materials that indicates early civilization on Nigeria. These Fifty (52) National Museum outlets spread across the country, and includes National Museum of Colonial history Aba, National Museum Abakaliki, National Museum Abeokuta, National Museum Akure, National Museum Asaba, National Museum Bauchi, National Museum Benin, National Museum Birnin Kudu, National Museum Calabar, Slave History Museum Calabar, National Museum Damaturu, Museum of National Unity Enugu, National Museum Esie, National Museum Gombe, National Museum Hong, Museum of National Unity Ibadan, National Museum Oko-Surulere, National Museum Igbo-Ukwu, National Museum Ile-Ife, National Museum Ilorin, National Museum Jos, National Museum Kanta, National Museum Kaduna, Gidan Makama National Museum Kano, National Museum Katsina, National Museum Koko, National Museum Lafia, National Museum Lagos, National Museum Lokoja, National Museum Maiduguri, National Museum Makurdi, National Museum Minna, National Museum Nok, National Museum Ogbomosho, National Museum Oron, National Museum Osogbo, National Museum Owerri, National Museum Owo, National Museum Oyo, National Museum Port-Harcourt, National Museum Sokoto, Interpretation Center Sukur, National Museum War Umuahia, National Museum Uyo, National Museum Yenagoa and National Museum Yola.

Sites managed by NCMM
The National Commission for Museums and Monuments (NCMM) also oversee two UNESCO World Heritage Sites namely Osun Osogbo Sacred Grove in Osun state.

Chief Executive Officer
The Director-General/Chief Executive Officer of National Commission for Museums and Monuments (NCMM) is Abba Isa Tijani, a professor of Museology and Anthropology, he was appointed on August 26, 2020, by President Mohammadu Buhari as the seventh indigenous substantive director-general/CEO of the commission.

List of National Museums

Listed National Monuments and Heritage Sites

 

 

|}

References

External links
 National Commission for Museums and Monuments

Heritage registers by country
Monuments and memorials in Nigeria
Tourist attractions in Nigeria
Museums in Nigeria